The Moonee Valley Gold Cup is a registered Moonee Valley Racing Club Group 2 Thoroughbred horse race for horses aged four-years-old and upwards under Set Weights with penalties conditions, over a distance of 2,500 metres, held annually at Moonee Valley Racecourse,  Melbourne, Australia in late October on W. S. Cox Plate Day. Prize money is A$1,000,000.

History
The event is the last major long distance event to be run before the Melbourne Cup. Kingston Rule was the only horse to win the Melbourne Cup after winning the Moonee Valley Cup in 1990. The Moonee Valley Cup has seen several double winners, such as Little Bob in 1891 & 1892, Gladwyn in 1914 and 1915, Gilltown in 1939 and 1940, Valcurl in 1945 and 1946 and Precedence in 2010 and 2013.

1948 racebook

Name
 1883–1975 - Moonee Valley Cup
 1976–1979 - Governors Stakes
 1980–1996 - Moonee Valley Cup
 1997–2002 - Grosby Gold Cup
 2003–2010 - Cathay Pacific Gold Cup
 2011–2013 - Drake International Cup
 2014 - racing.com Moonee Valley Gold Cup
 2015 - Melbourne Signage Concepts Moonee Valley Gold Cup
 2016 - Antler Luggage Moonee Valley Gold Cup
 2017–current - McCafe Moonee Valley Gold Cup

Distance
 1883–1884 - 1 mile (~1600 metres)
 1885–1888 - 6 furlongs (~1200 metres)
 1889–1899 - 7 furlongs (~1400 metres)
 1900–1908 - 1 miles (~2200 metres)
 1909 - 1 miles (~2400 metres)
 1910–1918 - 1 (~2000 metres)
 1919 - 1 miles (~2600 metres)
 1920 - 1 miles (~2400 metres)
 1921–1923 - 1 miles (~2600 metres)
 1924–1932 - 1 miles (~2300 metres)
 1933 - 1 miles (~2600 metres)
 1934–1935 1 miles (~2400 metres)
 1936–1972 - 1 miles (~2600 metres)
 1973–1994 – 2600 metres
 1995 onwards - 2500 metres

Grade
 1883–1978 was a Principal race
 1979 - Group 3 
 1980 onwards - Group 2

Winners

 2022 - Francesco Guardi
 2021 - Lunar Flare
 2020 - Miami Bound
 2019 - Hunting Horn
 2018 - Ventura Storm
 2017 - Who Shot Thebarman
 2016 - Grand Marshal
 2015 - The United States
 2014 - Prince Of Penzance
 2013 - Precedence
 2012 - Vatuvei
 2011 - Americain
 2010 - Precedence
 2009 - The Sportsman
 2008 - Gallopin
 2007 - Gallic
 2006 - Zipping
 2005 - Umbula
 2004 - Another Warrior
 2003 - Frightening
 2002 - Thong Classic
 2001 - Rain Gauge
 2000 - Yippyio
 1999 - Streak
 1998 - Price Standaan
 1997 - Court Of Honour
 1996 - Istidaad
 1995 - Storm
 1994 - Top Rating
 1993 - Glastonbury
 1992 - Donegal Mist
 1991 - Al Maheb
 1990 - Kingston Rule
 1989 - Sydeston
 1988 - Ideal Centreman
 1987 - King Matthias
 1986 - Reckless Tradition
 1985 - Butternut
 1984 - Holsam
 1983 - Toujours Mio
 1982 - Triumphal March
 1981 - Saxon Slew
 1980 - Tai Salute
 1979 - Sir Sahib
 1978 - Clear Day
 1977 - Ngawyni
 1976 - Poker Night
 1975 - Holiday Waggon
 1974 - Lord Metric
 1973 - Grand Scale
 1972 - Double Irish
 1971 - Skint Dip
 1970 - Mr. President
 1969 - What's Brewing
 1968 - Impetus
 1967 - Prince Camillo
 1966 - Tea Biscuit
 1965 - Red William
 1964 - Algalon
 1963 - My Contact
 1962 - River Seine
 1961 - Baroda Gleam
 1960 - Mac
 1959 - Sanvo
 1958 - Humber Hawk
 1957 - Lord Gavin
 1956 - Pandie Sun
 1955 - Al Crusa
 1954 - Hellion
 1953 - Wodalla
 1952 - King Amana
 1951 - Erriton
 1950 - Benvolo
 1949 - Hoyle
 1948 - Howe
 1947 - Don Pedro
 1946 - Valcurl
 1945 - Valcurl
 1944 - Queen Midas
 1943 - Haros
 1942 - Dark Felt
 1941 - Yours Truly
 1940 - Gilltown
 1939 - Gilltown
 1938 - Ortelle's Star
 1937 - Frill Prince
 1936 - Dark Chief
 1935 - Art
 1934 - Nightly
 1933 - Peter Jackson
 1932 - Yarramba
 1931 - Homedale
 1930 - Shadow King
 1929 - Prince Viol
 1928 - Nawallah
 1927 - Silvius
 1926 - Royal Charter
 1925 - Tookarby
 1924 - Stand By
 1923 - Princess Mernda
 1922 - Purser
 1921 - Wirriway
 1920 - White Plast
 1919 - Telecles
 1918 - Rael Locin
 1917 - Kunegetis
 1916 - Andelosia
 1915 - Gladwyn
 1914 - Gladwyn
 1913 - Greek Fire
 1912 - Almissa
 1911 - Hartfell
 1910 - Kerlie
 1909 - Flavinius
 1908 - Woorooma
 1907 - May King
 1906 - Charles Stuart
 1905 - Blue Spec
 1904 - Patronus
 1903 - T.M.S.
 1902 - The Persian
 1901 - Combat
 1900 - Clean Sweep
 1899 - Sweetheart
 1898 - Locksmith
 1897 - Mirella
 1896 - Veronica
 1895 - Our Jack
 1894 - Preston
 1893 - Premier
 1892 - Little Bob
 1891 - Little Bob
 1890 - Wiora
 1889 - Don Giovan
 1888 - Newmaster
 1887 - Quintin Matsys
 1886 - Isonomy
 1885 - Merrimu
 1884 - Meteor
 1883 - Castaway

See also
 List of Australian Group races
 Group races

References

Horse races in Australia
Open middle distance horse races
Recurring sporting events established in 1883
1883 establishments in Australia